Terror Inside is a 2008 American thriller film written and directed by Jozef G. Lenders and starring Corey Feldman and Tanya Memme. It premiered at the Fort Lauderdale International Film Festival on November 3, 2008 but never received theatrical distribution.

Plot
Joe Saluto, a well driller excavating geological samples for a university project in the fictional small Florida town of Montverde, is contaminated by a strange liquid that transposes his senses of pain and pleasure. Unaware he has been infected with a dangerous virus, he tries to impress Maria, a pretty waitress at the local diner, who is romantically involved with Allen Greenfield.

Allen's out-of-town job is affecting his relationship with Maria, so he decides to quit and propose to her. When he arrives in Montverde, he finds significant changes there. Maria, who earlier had hinted at marriage, now seems indifferent to it. The town is practically uninhabited and has a much darker air about it, and tattoo parlors and seedy shops have replaced the nice stores that once lined the main street. When Allen begins to investigate, he discovers the dreadful virus has forced the town people into self-mutilation.

Cast
Corey Feldman ..... Allen Greenfield 
Tanya Memme ..... Maria 
Joe Abby ..... Joe Saluto
Susie Feldman ..... Katie
Chad Jamian Williams ..... Office Pal

Production
The film was made on location in Montverde, Florida, Fort Myers, and Cape Coral.

Awards and nominations
The film won five Crystal Reel Awards presented by the Florida Motion Picture and Television Association. These included Best Feature Film Under $1 Million, Best Director (Jozef G. Lenders) of a Feature Film Under $1 Million, Best Editing (Jozef G. Lenders)  of a Feature Film Under $1 Million, and Best Leading Actress (Tanya Memme) and Actor (Corey Feldman) in a Feature Film Under $1 Million.

References

External links
Official Website

2008 films
2000s thriller films
American independent films
Films set in Florida
Films about self-harm
2000s English-language films
2000s American films